Graham Oates (born 14 March 1949) is an English retired footballer who played for Bradford City, Blackburn Rovers and Newcastle United. He also played for the Detroit Express and the California Surf in the NASL.

While at Newcastle United, Oates scored an own goal in a match against Leeds United directly from the kick-off, lobbing goalkeeper Willie McFaul in the process. McFaul is said to have been well out of position in the execution of the preplanned play.

While a member of the Detroit Express, Oates coached the Bloomfield Hills Andover High School boys soccer team through the 1978 and 1979 seasons. In his first stint as a head coach, Oates led the 1978 squad to the Michigan High School State Soccer Championship.

References

External links

NASL career stats

1949 births
Living people
English footballers
English expatriate footballers
Bradford City A.F.C. players
Blackburn Rovers F.C. players
Newcastle United F.C. players
Detroit Express players
California Surf players
English Football League players
North American Soccer League (1968–1984) players
North American Soccer League (1968–1984) indoor players
Footballers from Bradford
Expatriate soccer players in the United States
Association football midfielders
English expatriate sportspeople in the United States